The Sacred Heart Catholic Church is a Roman Catholic church in Heron Lake, Minnesota, United States. It is part of the Diocese of Winona–Rochester. Built in 1921 at a cost of $150,000, the church was designed by architects Parkinson & Dockendorff of La Crosse, Wisconsin.   The design is Neo-Baroque with neoclassical touches.   It was modeled after Central European churches and based on a basilica plan with prominent twin bell towers.  It was dedicated in August 1921 in a ceremony officiated by Bishop Patrick R. Heffron of the Diocese of Winona.  The church was listed on the National Register of Historic Places in 1989.

References

External links
 Sacred Heart Catholic Church

Buildings and structures in Jackson County, Minnesota
Churches on the National Register of Historic Places in Minnesota
Roman Catholic churches completed in 1921
Churches in the Roman Catholic Diocese of Winona-Rochester
National Register of Historic Places in Jackson County, Minnesota
20th-century Roman Catholic church buildings in the United States